Akira Matsunaga may refer to:
 Akira Matsunaga (footballer, born 1914) (松永 行), Japanese footballer
 Akira Matsunaga (footballer, born 1948) (松永 章), Japanese footballer